Potter's Tavern is located in Bridgeton, Cumberland County, New Jersey, United States. The building was built in 1775 and was added to the National Register of Historic Places on September 10, 1971.

See also
National Register of Historic Places listings in Cumberland County, New Jersey

References

 History and information - Cumberland County

Bridgeton, New Jersey
Commercial buildings on the National Register of Historic Places in New Jersey
Commercial buildings completed in 1775
Buildings and structures in Cumberland County, New Jersey
National Register of Historic Places in Cumberland County, New Jersey
New Jersey Register of Historic Places
Taverns in the American Revolution
Taverns in New Jersey